Björn Rune Borg (born 6 June 1956) is a Swedish former world No. 1 tennis player. Between 1974 and 1981, he became the first man in the Open Era to win 11 Grand Slam singles titles with six at the French Open and five consecutively at Wimbledon.

Borg won four consecutive French Open titles (1978–81) and is 6–0 in French Open finals. He was the first man since 1886 to contest six consecutive Wimbledon finals, a record surpassed by Roger Federer's seven consecutive finals (2003–09). He is the only man to achieve the Channel Slam three times. Borg contested the French Open, Wimbledon and US Open finals in the same year three times (1978, 1980–81). He won three major titles without dropping a set during those tournaments. However, he never won the US Open despite four runner-up finishes.

Borg also won three year-end championships and 16 Grand Prix Super Series titles. Overall, he set numerous records that still stand. He was ATP Player of the Year from 1976 to 1980, and was the year-end world No. 1 in the ATP rankings in 1979 and 1980 and ITF World Champion from 1978 to 1980. Borg is the only Swede, male or female, to win over 10 majors. Borg unexpectedly retired from tennis in 1981, at the age of 25. He made a brief and unsuccessful comeback in 1991.

Borg is widely considered one of the all-time greats of the sport. He was ranked by Tennis magazine as the sixth-greatest male player of the Open Era. His rivalry with John McEnroe is considered one of the best in the sport's history, and their meeting in the 1980 Wimbledon final is considered one of the greatest matches ever played. A teenage sensation at the start of his career, Borg experienced unprecedented stardom and consistent success that helped propel the rising popularity of tennis during the 1970s. As a result, the professional tour became more lucrative, and in 1979, Borg became the first player to earn more than US$1 million in prize money in a single season.

Early life

Björn Borg was born in Stockholm, Sweden, on 6 June 1956, as the only child of Rune (1932–2008), an electrician, and Margaretha Borg (b. 1934). He grew up in nearby Södertälje. As a child, Borg became fascinated with a golden tennis racket that his father won at a table-tennis tournament. His father gave him the racket, beginning his tennis career.

A player of great athleticism and endurance, he had a distinctive style and appearance—bowlegged and very fast. His muscularity allowed him to put heavy topspin on both his forehand and two-handed backhand. He followed Jimmy Connors in using the two-handed backhand. By the time he was 13, he was beating the best of Sweden's under-18 players, and Davis Cup captain Lennart Bergelin (who served as Borg's primary coach throughout his professional career) cautioned against anyone trying to change Borg's rough-looking, jerky strokes.

Career

1972–73 – Davis Cup debut and first year on the tour
At the age of 15, Borg represented Sweden in the 1972 Davis Cup and won his debut singles rubber in five sets against veteran Onny Parun of New Zealand. Later that year, he won the Wimbledon junior singles title, recovering from a 5–2 deficit in the final set to overcome Britain's Buster Mottram. Then in December, he won the Orange Bowl Junior Championship for boys 18 and under after a straight-sets victory in the final over Vitas Gerulaitis. Borg joined the professional circuit in 1973, and reached his first singles final in April at the Monte Carlo Open, which he lost to Ilie Năstase. He was unseeded at his first French Open and reached the fourth round where he lost in four sets to eighth-seeded Adriano Panatta. Borg was seeded sixth at his first Wimbledon Championships, in large part due to a boycott by the ATP, and reached the quarterfinal, where he was defeated in a five-set match by Roger Taylor. In the second half of 1973, he was runner-up in San Francisco, Stockholm and Buenos Aires and finished the year ranked No. 18.

1974 – First French Open title

Borg made his only appearance at the Australian Open at the age of 17, and reached the third round, where he lost in straight sets to eventual finalist Phil Dent. In January, he won his first career singles title at the New Zealand Open, followed by titles in London and São Paulo in February and March respectively. Just before his 18th birthday in June 1974, Borg won his first top-level singles title at the Italian Open, defeating defending champion and top-seeded Ilie Năstase in the final and becoming its youngest winner. Two weeks later, he won the singles title at the French Open, his first Grand Slam tournament title, defeating Manuel Orantes in the final in five sets. Barely 18, Borg was the youngest-ever male French Open champion up to that point.

1975 – Retained French Open title
In early 1975, Borg defeated Rod Laver, then 36 years old, in a semifinal of the World Championship Tennis (WCT) finals in Dallas, Texas, in five sets. Borg subsequently lost to Arthur Ashe in the final.
Borg retained his French Open title in 1975, beating Guillermo Vilas in the final in straight sets. Borg then reached the Wimbledon quarterfinals, where he lost to eventual champion Ashe. Borg did not lose another match at Wimbledon until 1981. Borg won two singles and one doubles rubber in the 1975 Davis Cup final, as Sweden beat Czechoslovakia 3–2. With these singles wins, Borg had won 19 consecutive Davis Cup singles rubbers since 1973. That was already a record at the time. However, Borg never lost another Davis Cup singles rubber, and, by the end of his career, he had stretched that winning streak to 33.

1976 – First Wimbledon title

In early 1976, Borg won the World Championship Tennis year-end WCT Finals in Dallas, Texas, with a four-set victory over Guillermo Vilas in the final. At the 1976 French Open, Borg lost to the Italian Adriano Panatta, who remains the only player to defeat Borg at this tournament. Panatta did it twice: in the fourth round in 1973, and in the 1976 quarterfinals. Borg won Wimbledon in 1976 without losing a set, defeating the favored Ilie Năstase in the final. Borg became the youngest male Wimbledon champion of the modern era at 20 years and 1 month (a record subsequently broken by Boris Becker, who won Wimbledon aged 17 in 1985). Năstase later said, "We're playing tennis, he's playing something else." Borg also reached the final of the 1976 U.S. Open, which was then being played on clay courts. Borg lost in four sets to world no. 1 Jimmy Connors. Borg was awarded the ATP Player of the Year award and ranked world No. 1 by Tennis Magazine (France).

1977 – Second Wimbledon title and world No.1 ranking
In February 1977 World Championship Tennis (WCT) sued Borg and his management company IMG claiming that Borg had committed a breach of contract by electing to participate in the competing 1977 Grand Prix circuit instead of the WCT circuit. Borg eventually played, and won, a single WCT event, the Monte Carlo WCT. An out-of-court settlement was reached whereby Borg committed to play six or eight WCT events in 1978 which were then part of the Grand Prix circuit.

Borg skipped the French Open in 1977 because he was under contract with WTT, but he repeated his Wimbledon triumph, although this time he was pushed much harder. He defeated his good friend Vitas Gerulaitis in a semifinal in five sets. In the 1977 final Borg was pushed to five sets for the third time in the tournament, this time by Connors. The win propelled Borg to the No. 1 ranking in the ATP point system, albeit for just one week in August. Prior to the 1977 US Open, Borg aggravated a shoulder injury while waterskiing with Vitas Gerulaitis. This injury ultimately forced him to retire from the Open during a Round of 16 match vs Dick Stockton. Borg was rated number one for 1977 by Tennis Magazine (France), Tennis Magazine (U.S.), Barry Lorge, Lance Tingay, Rino Tommasi, Judith Elian and Rod Laver. Borg was also named "ATP Player of the Year". Through 1977, he had never lost to a player younger than himself.

1978 – French and Wimbledon titles
Borg was at the height of his career from 1978 through 1980, completing the French Open-Wimbledon double all three years. In 1978, Borg won the French Open with a win over Vilas in the final. Borg did not drop a set during the tournament, a feat only he, Năstase (in 1973), and Rafael Nadal (in 2008, 2010, 2017 and 2020) have accomplished at the French Open during the open era. Borg defeated Connors in straight sets in the 1978 Wimbledon final. At the 1978 US Open, now held on hard courts in Flushing Meadow, New York, he lost the final in straight sets to Connors. Borg was suffering from a bad blister on his thumb that required pre-match injections. That autumn, Borg faced John McEnroe for the first time in a semifinal of the Stockholm Open, and lost. Borg was named ATP Player of the Year and was the first ITF World Champion.

1979 – French and Wimbledon titles and year-end No. 1 ranking

Borg lost to McEnroe again in four sets in the final of the 1979 WCT Finals but was now overtaking Connors for the top ranking. Borg established himself firmly in the top spot with his fourth French Open singles title and fourth straight Wimbledon singles title, defeating Connors in a straight-set semifinal at the latter tournament. At the 1979 French Open, Borg defeated big-serving Victor Pecci in a four-set final, and in the 1979 Wimbledon final Borg came from behind to overcome an even bigger server, Roscoe Tanner. Borg was upset by Tanner at the US Open, in a four-set quarterfinal played under the lights. At the season-ending Masters tournament in January 1980, Borg survived a close semifinal against McEnroe. He then beat Gerulaitis in straight sets, winning his first Masters and first title in New York. Borg finished the year at No. 1 in the ATP Point rankings and was considered the No. 1 player in the world by most authorities.

1980 – French and fifth consecutive Wimbledon title
In June, Borg overcame Gerulaitis, again in straight sets, for his fifth French Open title. Again, he did not drop a set during the tournament.

Borg then won his fifth consecutive Wimbledon singles title, defeating McEnroe in a five-set final, often cited as the best Wimbledon final ever played. Having lost the opening set to an all-out McEnroe assault, Borg took the next two and had two championship points at 5–4 in the fourth. However, McEnroe averted disaster and went on to level the match in Wimbledon's most memorable tiebreaker, which McEnroe won 18–16. In the fourth-set tiebreak, McEnroe saved five match points, and Borg six set points, before McEnroe won the set. Björn served first to begin the 5th set and fell behind 0–30. Borg then won 19 straight points on serve in the deciding set and prevailed after 3 hours, 53 minutes. Borg himself commented years later that this was the first time that he was afraid that he would lose, as well as feeling that it was the beginning of the end of his dominance.

In September, 1980 Borg reached the final of the U.S. Open for the third time, losing to John McEnroe in five sets in a match that cemented what had become the greatest contemporary rivalry, albeit short-lived, in men's tennis.

He defeated McEnroe in the final of the 1980 Stockholm Open, and faced him one more time that year, in the round-robin portion of the year-end Masters, actually played in January 1981. With 19,103 fans in attendance, Borg won a deciding third-set tie-break for the second year in a row. Borg then defeated Ivan Lendl for his second Masters title. Borg again finished the year at No. 1 in the ATP Point Rankings and was considered the No. 1 player in the world by most tennis authorities.

1981 – Sixth and final French Open title
Borg won his last Grand Slam title at the French Open in 1981, defeating Lendl in a five-set final. Borg's six French Open Grand Slam titles was a record bettered only by Rafael Nadal in 2012.

In reaching the Wimbledon final in 1981, Borg stretched his winning streak at the All England Club to a record 41 matches. In a semifinal, Borg was down to Connors by two sets to love, before coming back to win the match. However, Borg's streak was brought to an end by McEnroe, who defeated him in four sets. Years afterward, Borg remarked "And when I lost what shocked me was I wasn't even upset. That was not me: losing a Wimbledon final and not upset. I hate to lose." Borg around that time felt that his desire to play was gone, despite McEnroe's desperate efforts to persuade him not to retire and continue their rivalry.

Borg went on to lose to McEnroe at the 1981 US Open. After that defeat, Borg walked off the court and out of the stadium before the ceremonies and press conference had begun, and headed straight for the airport. There are reports that Borg received threats after his semifinal win over Connors. In later years, Borg apologized to McEnroe. The 1981 US Open would be the Swede's last Grand Slam final. Major tournaments and tour organizers were enforcing a new rule; by 1982, that players had to play at least 10 official tournaments per year. However, Borg wanted to curtail his schedule after many years of winning so often. Although he felt in good condition physically, he recognized that the relentless drive to win and defy tour organizers had begun to fade.

Borg failed to win the US Open in nine tries, losing four finals, 1976 (the surface was clay that year) and 1978 to Jimmy Connors, and 1980 and 1981 to John McEnroe.  The surface was hard court from 1978 onward and Borg reached the final there on hard court on three occasions, in 1978, 1980 and 1981. He led 3–2 in the fifth set of the 1980 final, before losing. That match followed Borg's classic encounter with McEnroe at the 1980 Wimbledon. In 1978, 1979 and 1980, Borg was halfway to a Grand Slam after victories at the French and Wimbledon (the Australian Open being the last Grand Slam tournament of each year at the time) only to falter at Flushing Meadows, the left-handed Roscoe Tanner being his conqueror in 1979.

1982–91 – Retirement

In 1982, Borg played only one tournament, losing to Yannick Noah in the quarterfinals of Monte Carlo in April. Nevertheless, Borg's announcement in January 1983 that he was retiring from the game at the age of 26 was a shock to the tennis world. McEnroe tried unsuccessfully to persuade Borg to continue. He did, however, play Monte Carlo again in March 1983, reaching the second round, and Stuttgart in July 1984.

Upon retirement, Borg had three residences: a penthouse in Monte Carlo, not far from his pro shop; a mansion on Long Island, New York and a small island off the Swedish coast.

Borg later bounced back as the owner of the Björn Borg fashion label. In Sweden, his label has become very successful, second only to Calvin Klein.

Attempted comeback
In 1991–1993, Borg attempted a comeback on the men's professional tennis tour, coached by Welsh karate expert Ron Thatcher. Before his 1991 return, Borg grew his hair out as it had been during his previous professional tennis career and he returned to using a wooden racket; he had kept his hair cut and used modern graphite rackets in exhibitions he played during the late 1980s. Borg, however, failed to win a single match. He faced Jordi Arrese in his first match back, again at Monte Carlo but without practising or playing any exhibition matches and lost in two sets. In his first nine matches, played in 1991 and 1992, Borg failed to win a single set. He fared slightly better in 1993, taking a set off his opponent in each of the three matches he played. He came closest to getting a win in what turned out to be his final tour match, falling to second seed Alexander Volkov 6–4, 3–6, 6–7(7–9) at the 1993 Kremlin Cup in Moscow.

In 1992 Borg, aged 35, using a graphite racket, defeated John Lloyd, 37, at the Inglewood Forum Tennis Challenge. Borg later joined the Champions tour, using modern rackets.

Playing style

Borg had one of the most distinctive playing styles in the Open Era. He played from the baseline, with powerful ground-strokes. His highly unorthodox backhand involved taking his racket back with both hands but actually generating his power with his dominant right hand, letting go of the grip with his left hand around point of contact, and following through with his swing as a one-hander. He hit the ball hard and high from the back of the court and brought it down with considerable topspin, which made his ground strokes very consistent. There had been other players, particularly Rod Laver and Arthur Ashe, who played with topspin on both the forehand and backhand, yet Laver and Ashe used topspin only as a way to mix up their shots to pass their opponents at the net easily. Borg was one of the first top players to use heavy topspin on his shots consistently.

Complementing his consistent ground-strokes was his fitness. Both of these factors allowed Borg to be dominant at the French Open.

One of the factors that made Borg unique was his dominance on the grass courts of Wimbledon, where, since World War II, baseliners did not usually succeed. Some experts attributed his dominance on this surface to his consistency, an underrated serve, equally underrated volleys, and his adaptation to grass courts. Against the best players, he almost always served-and-volleyed on his first serves, while he naturally played from the baseline after his second serves.

Another trait usually associated with Borg was his grace under pressure. His calm court demeanor earned him the nickname of the "Ice Man" or "Ice-Borg".

Borg's physical conditioning was unrivalled by contemporaries. He could outlast most of his opponents under the most grueling conditions. Contrary to popular belief, however, this was not due to his exceptionally low resting heart rate, often reported to be near 35 beats per minute. In his introduction to Borg's autobiography My Life and Game, Eugene Scott relates that this rumor arose from a medical exam the 18-year-old Borg once took for military service, where his pulse was recorded as 38. Scott goes on to reveal Borg's true pulse rate as "about 50 when he wakes up and around 60 in the afternoon". Borg is credited with helping to develop the style of play that has come to dominate the game today.

Mental approach
Borg's first wife has said that he was "always very placid and calm, except if he lost a match – he wouldn't talk for at least three days. He couldn't stand losing." This mental approach changed by 1981, when he has said that when he lost the Wimbledon final "what shocked me was I wasn't even upset".

Personal life

Borg and Romanian tennis pro Mariana Simionescu began their relationship in 1976 and married in Bucharest on 24 July 1980. The marriage ended in divorce in 1984. He fathered a son named Robin in 1985 with the Swedish model Jannike Björling; Robin had a daughter in 2014. Borg was married to the Italian singer Loredana Bertè from 1989 to 1993. On 8 June 2002, he married his third wife, Patricia Östfeld. Together they have a son, Leo, born in 2003, who is also a professional tennis player.

He narrowly avoided personal bankruptcy when business ventures failed. After selling his mansion Astaholm at Ingarö in the Stockholm archipelago in 2019, Björn currently lives in an apartment in Norrmalm, central Stockholm with Ace of Base star Ulf Ekberg as one of his neighbours.

Film
In 2017, Borg vs McEnroe, a biographical film focusing on the rivalry between Borg and McEnroe and the 1980 Wimbledon final, was released. In 2022, interviews about this friendship and rivalry were also featured in "McEnroe," a Showtime documentary.

Memorabilia preserved
In March 2006, Bonhams Auction House in London announced that it would auction Borg's Wimbledon trophies and two of his winning rackets on 21 June 2006. Several players then called Borg in an attempt to make him reconsider, including Jimmy Connors and Andre Agassi, who volunteered to buy them to keep them together. According to Dagens Nyheter – who had talked to Borg – McEnroe called Borg from New York and asked, "What's up? Have you gone mad?" and said "What the hell are you doing?" The conversation with McEnroe, paired with pleas from Connors and Agassi, eventually persuaded Borg to buy out the trophies from Bonhams for an undisclosed amount.

Distinctions and honors
 Borg was ranked by the ATP rankings world no. 1 in six stretches between 1977 and 1981, totaling 109 weeks.
 During his career, he won a total of 77 (64 listed on the Association of Tennis Professionals website) top-level singles and four doubles titles.
 Borg won the BBC Sports Personality of the Year Overseas Personality Award in 1979.
 Borg was inducted into the International Tennis Hall of Fame in 1987.
 On 10 December 2006, the British Broadcasting Corporation gave Borg a Lifetime Achievement Award, which was presented by Boris Becker.
 In December 2014 he was elected Sweden's top sportsperson of all time by the newspaper Dagens Nyheter.

Recognition

With 11 Grand Slam titles, Borg ranks sixth in the list of male tennis players who have won the most Grand Slam singles titles behind Rafael Nadal and Novak Djokovic (22 each), Roger Federer (20), Pete Sampras (14) and Roy Emerson (12). The French Open—Wimbledon double he achieved three times consecutively was described by Wimbledon officials as "the most difficult double in tennis". Only Nadal (in 2008 and 2010), Federer (in 2009), and Djokovic (in 2021) have managed to achieve this double since, and Andre Agassi, Nadal, Federer and Djokovic are the only male players since Borg to have won the French Open and Wimbledon men's singles titles over their career. Ilie Năstase once said about Borg, "We're playing tennis, and he's playing something else".
Borg is widely considered to be one of the greatest players in the history of the sport.
In his 1979 autobiography, Jack Kramer, the long-time tennis promoter and great player himself, had already included Borg in his list of the 21 greatest players of all time. And in 2003, Bud Collins chose Borg as one of his top-five male players of all time. In 1983 Fred Perry listed his greatest male players of all time and listed them in two categories, before World War 2 and after. Perry's modern best behind Laver: "Borg, McEnroe, Connors, Hoad, Jack Kramer, John Newcombe, Ken Rosewall, Manuel Santana". In 1988, a panel consisting of Bud Collins, Cliff Drysdale, and Butch Buchholz ranked their top five male tennis players of all time. Buchholz and Drysdale both listed Borg number two on their lists, behind Rod Laver. Collins listed Borg number five behind Laver, McEnroe, Rosewall and Gonzales.

In 2008, ESPN.com asked tennis analysts, writers, and former players to build the perfect open-era player. Borg was the only player mentioned in four categories: defense, footwork, intangibles, and mental toughness—with his mental game and footwork singled out as the best in open-era history.

Borg never won the US Open, losing in the final four times. Borg also did not win the Australian Open, which he only played once in 1974 as a 17-year-old. The only players to defeat Borg in a Grand Slam final were fellow World No. 1 tennis players John McEnroe and Jimmy Connors. Even though it was then played on grass, a surface where he enjoyed much success, Borg chose to play the Australian Open only once, in 1974, where he lost in the third round. Phil Dent, a contemporary of Borg, has pointed out that skipping Grand Slam tournaments—especially the Australian Open—was not unusual then, before counting Grand Slam titles became the norm. Additionally, another contemporary Arthur Ashe told Sports Illustrated, "I think Bjorn could have won the US Open. I think he could have won the Grand Slam, but by the time he left, the historical challenge didn't mean anything. He was bigger than the game. He was like Elvis or Liz Taylor or somebody."

Laver Cup
From 22 to 24 September 2017, Borg was the victorious captain of Team Europe in the first-ever edition of the Laver Cup, held in Prague, Czech Republic. Borg's Team Europe defeated a rest of the world team, known as Team World, who were coached by Borg's old rival, John McEnroe. Europe won the contest 15 points to 9, with Roger Federer achieving a narrow vital victory over Nick Kyrgios in the last match played.

Borg returned as the coach of Team Europe for the second edition in Chicago, Illinois from 21 to 23 September 2018. McEnroe also returned as the coach for Team World. Borg again led Europe to victory as Alexander Zverev defeated Kevin Anderson to secure the title 13–8, after trailing Anderson in the match tiebreak until the last few points.

In the tournament's third edition, held in Geneva, Switzerland, from 20 to 22 September 2019, Borg captained Team Europe to a third consecutive victory, defeating McEnroe's Team World 13 points to 11, with Zverev again winning the deciding match.

The fourth edition was held in Boston from 24 to 26 September 2021, having had its original September 2020 date postponed due to the COVID-19 pandemic. Borg once again returned as captain of Team Europe, which had a resounding win over Team World, defeating McEnroe's players 14 to 1.

Career statistics

Singles performance timeline

 The Australian Open was held twice in 1977, in January and December. Borg did not play in either.
 The 1972 US Open had a special preliminary round before the main 128 player draw began.

Records

 These records were attained in the entire period of tennis from 1877.
 Records in bold indicate peer-less achievements.
 ^ Denotes consecutive streak.

All-time records

Open Era records

 These records were attained in the Open Era period of tennis from 1968.
 Records in bold indicate peer-less achievements.
 ^ Denotes consecutive streak.

Professional awards
 ITF World Champion: 1978, 1979, 1980
 ATP Player of the Year: 1976, 1977, 1978, 1979, 1980

See also

 Borg–McEnroe rivalry
 Borg–Connors rivalry
 List of Grand Slam men's singles champions
 List of Swedish sportspeople
 World number one male tennis player rankings
 Björn Borg (brand)

Notes

References

Sources
 
 
 John Barrett, editor, World of Tennis Yearbooks, London, from 1976 through 1983.
 Michel Sutter, Vainqueurs Winners 1946–2003, Paris, 2003. Sutter has attempted to list all tournaments meeting his criteria for selection beginning with 1946 and ending in the fall of 1991. For each tournament, he has indicated the city, the date of the final, the winner, the runner-up, and the score of the final. A tournament is included in his list if: (1) the draw for the tournament included at least eight players (with a few exceptions, such as the Pepsi Grand Slam tournaments in the second half of the 1970s which included only players that had won a Grand Slam tournament); and (2) the level of the tournaments was at least equal to the present day challenger tournaments. Sutter's book is probably the most exhaustive source of tennis tournament information since World War II, even though some professional tournaments held before the start of the open era are missing. Later, Sutter issued a second edition of his book, with only the players, their wins, and years for the 1946 through 27 April 2003, period.

Video
 The Wimbledon Collection – Legends of Wimbledon – Bjorn Borg Standing Room Only, DVD Release Date: 21 September 2004, Run Time: 52 minutes, ASIN: B0002HODA4.
 The Wimbledon Collection – The Classic Match – Borg vs. McEnroe 1981 Final Standing Room Only, DVD Release Date: 21 September 2004, Run Time: 210 minutes, ASIN: B0002HODAE.
 The Wimbledon Collection – The Classic Match – Borg vs. McEnroe 1980 Final Standing Room Only, DVD Release Date: 21 September 2004, Run Time: 240 minutes; ASIN: B0002HOEK8.
 Wimbledon Classic Match: Gerulaitis vs Borg Standing Room Only, DVD Release Date: 31 October 2006, Run Time: 180 minutes, ASIN: B000ICLR8O.

External links
 
 
 
 
 Official Wimbledon website profile
 BBC profile
 Sunday Times article 5 July 2009

 
French Open champions
International Tennis Hall of Fame inductees
Living people
People from Monte Carlo
People from Södertälje
Tennis players from Stockholm
Swedish expatriate sportspeople in Monaco
Swedish male tennis players
Wimbledon champions
Wimbledon junior champions
1956 births
Grand Slam (tennis) champions in men's singles
Grand Slam (tennis) champions in boys' singles
Masters tennis players
ATP number 1 ranked singles tennis players
ITF World Champions